Marc Elder (Marcel Tendron) (31 October 1884, Nantes – 16 August 1933, Saint-Fiacre-sur-Maine) was a French writer, winner of the Prix Goncourt for The People of the Sea.

Life

He was a critic and art historian, a Knight of the Legion of Honor, he was curator of the Chateau des Ducs de Bretagne, in Nantes.  The Place Marc Elder in the center of Nantes is named for him.

Works
 Le Peuple de la mer, G. Oudin, 1914
 Deux essais: Octave Mirbeau, Romain Rolland, G. Crès, 1914
 La vie apostolique de Vincent Vingeame, Calmann-Lévy, 1917
 Le sang des dieux, A. Michel, 1921
 À Giverny, chez Claude Monet, Bernheim-Jeune, 1924
 Gabriel-Belot, peintre imagier, A. Delpeuch, 1927
 Pays de Retz, Emile-Paul, 1928
 Les Dames Pirouette,''' J. Ferenczi & fils, 1929
 Croisières J. Ferenczi & Fils, 1931
 La belle Eugénie: roman, Ferenczi et fils, 1931
 Jacques et Jean: bois originaux en couleurs de Robert Antral, Ferenczi et Fils, 1931
 La Bourrine - Le Beau livre N°4, 1932
 Jacques Cassard: corsaire de Nantes, J. Ferenczi, 1933
 Marc Elder, ou, Un rêve écartelé'', Roger Douillard ed., Cid éditions, 1987

Anthologies

References

External links  
 
 

1884 births
1933 deaths
Writers from Nantes
20th-century French novelists
French art historians
Prix Goncourt winners
Chevaliers of the Légion d'honneur
French male novelists
20th-century French male writers
French male non-fiction writers